Barbara Schöne (born 1947) is a German actress. She has more than a hundred credited appearances. Although she is primarily a television actress, she has also appeared in several films including the sports comedy Willi Manages the Whole Thing (1972)

She is the daughter of the art director Werner Schöne.

Selected filmography
 Willi Manages the Whole Thing (1972)
 Baltic Storm (2003)
 Too Hard to Handle (2016)

References

Bibliography
 Goble, Alan. The Complete Index to Literary Sources in Film. Walter de Gruyter, 1999.

External links

1947 births
Living people
German television actresses
German film actresses
20th-century German actresses
21st-century German actresses
Actresses from Berlin
Recipients of the Order of Merit of Berlin